"Person or Persons Unknown" is episode 92 of the American television anthology series The Twilight Zone.

Opening narration

Plot
David Gurney wakes up from a night of wild partying to find that nobody recognizes him, and all evidence of his identity had disappeared. His wife, friends, co-workers, and mother all deny knowing him. 

He is placed in an insane asylum, where his doctor, Koslenko, tells him that David Gurney does not exist, and is only a delusional construct. Gurney deems this impossible since he has extensive memories of his life and the people he knows, and becomes convinced that someone wants to blot him out. He jumps through the window of the asylum, steals a van, and goes searching for evidence of his identity. 

He finds a photograph of him holding his wife, and says that the photo and its date disprove his wife's claim that she never saw him before. However, when the police arrive with the psychiatrist, the picture has somehow changed and portrays Gurney alone, inexplicably grasping thin air. He throws himself to the ground and wakes up in his bed. 

The whole adventure was a bad dream. His wife, Wilma, gets up from the bed and talks to him from the bathroom, where she removes cream from her face. When she emerges, Gurney is horrified to discover that, even though she acts and talks the same way, his wife does not look at all like the wife he knows.

Closing narration

See also
 Nowhere Man (TV series)
 Flow My Tears, the Policeman Said

References

 Zicree, Marc Scott. The Twilight Zone Companion, Bantam Books, 1982. 
DeVoe, Bill. (2008). Trivia from The Twilight Zone. Albany, GA: Bear Manor Media. 
Grams, Martin. (2008). The Twilight Zone: Unlocking the Door to a Television Classic. Churchville, MD: OTR Publishing.

External links

1962 American television episodes
The Twilight Zone (1959 TV series season 3) episodes
Television shows written by Charles Beaumont
Television episodes about dreams
Television episodes about nightmares